The  doubles Tournament at the 2006 Toray Pan Pacific Open took place between 30 January and 5 February on the indoor hard courts of the Tokyo Metropolitan Gymnasium in Tokyo, Japan. Lisa Raymond and Samantha Stosur won the title, defeating Cara Black and Rennae Stubbs in the final.

Seeds

Draw

References
 Main Draw

2006 Doubles
Toray Pan Pacific Open - Doubles
2006 Toray Pan Pacific Open